Trarium or Trarion was a town of ancient Mysia, not far from Perperena.

Its site is located near Yukarı Beyköy, Asiatic Turkey.

References

Populated places in ancient Mysia
Former populated places in Turkey